That's Not My Dog! is a 2018 Australian comedy film written and directed by Dean Murphy and starring Shane Jacobson. Each of the cast members in the film are portraying themselves. The film had a limited cinematic release from 15–18 March 2018, which was extended due to popular demand from audiences.

On 31 March 2018, the film was added to the library of streaming service Stan, despite still screening in some cinemas. The film was released on DVD on 9 May 2018, and includes a behind the scenes feature.

Plot synopsis
The film centres on Shane Jacobson who is throwing a party for his father. Invited are the funniest people Shane knows—Australia's biggest stars along with several Australian music legends playing their biggest hits live, right throughout the party. Featuring little to no developing plot or storyline, the film is instead set on the premise that each invited guest needs to bring nothing except their favourite joke, which each proceeds to tell throughout the night.

Cast
Note: All cast members play themselves.
Michala Banas
Christie Whelan Browne
Paul Fenech
Tim Ferguson
John Foreman
Paul Hogan
Shane Jacobson
Jimeoin
Ed Kavalee
Anthony Lehmann
Fiona O'Loughlin
Steve Vizard

References

External links
That's Not My Dog! on IMDb
 
That's Not My Dog! on Facebook

Australian comedy films
2018 comedy films
2010s English-language films